Wawayanda may refer to:

Wawayanda, New York, a town in Orange County
Wawayanda Creek, in Sussex County, New Jersey
Wawayanda Mountain, in Sussex County, New Jersey
Wawayanda Patent, an early land grant in the Hudson valley
Wawayanda State Park, in Sussex and Passaic Counties, New Jersey